The Auntie Dee Show was a 1950s television show in Detroit, Michigan. The show's host Dee Parker sang with Vaughn Monroe's orchestra from 1943-44, with whom she recorded such songs as "One Too Often" and "When You Put On That Old Blue Suit Again" under the name "Del Parker". She changed her name to "Dee Parker" when she joined Jimmy Dorsey's band, with whom she recorded more than a dozen songs for Decca Records and MGM Records, before she found fame in Detroit [early 1950s] as TV kiddie talent show host, "Auntie Dee". She also hosted a short-lived variety show titled "Rehearsal Call" in 1949. "Uncle Jimmy" (Stevenson) was the piano player on "The Auntie Dee Show." Parker moved to Los Angeles in 1956, where she continued her TV show and was a fixture at local supper clubs. She died in 2000. Among the performers on the show was 5 year old Mary Prevost, 7 year old composer/pianist Paul Schoenfield, and 14 year old Ursula Walker.[1]
 
The reward for performing was, depending on the episode's sponsor, a six-pack of Faygo Pop or a can of New Era potato chips.

References

External links
Del Parker
Detroit Memories Newsletter April 2009
DETROIT MEMORIES - Michigan Gas Prices
DEE PARKER - NEON SIGN  Dee Parker sings "Neon Sign"
YouTube  Dee Parker sings "Doin' What Comes "Natur'lly" with Jimmy Dorsey
Jimmy Dorsey - Heartaches  Dee Parker and Bob Carroll sing "Heartaches" with Jimmy Dorsey

1950s American children's television series
Black-and-white American television shows
Local children's television programming in the United States
Year of television series debut missing
Year of television series ending missing